Mende may refer to:

Ethnic group
 Mende people
 Mende language
 Mende syllabary (Kikakui)

People
Mende (surname)
Mende Nazer (born c.1982), Sudanese-British author and human rights activist

Places
 various geographic designations in the department of Lozère, France:
Arrondissement of Mende
Mende, Lozère
Roman Catholic Diocese of Mende
 Mende (Chalcidice), a city in ancient Greece
 Mende, Hungary, a village in Pest county
 Mount Mende, Antarctica

Language and nationality disambiguation pages